Joey Gugliemelli, best known by the stage name Sherry Pie, is an American drag performer most known for being disqualified from the twelfth season of RuPaul's Drag Race.

Following multiple revelations of sexual misconduct, Sherry Pie was disqualified from the show and mostly edited out of the American broadcast; initial overseas screenings retained the original edit. Sherry originally placed as one of the top four queens of the season, alongside Gigi Goode, Crystal Methyd, and Jaida Essence Hall but, due to her disqualification, she finished in 4th place and did not participate in the finale.

Disqualification from RuPaul's Drag Race

On March 4, 2020, Ben Shimkus, a 25-year-old actor, posted an update to the social media site Facebook detailing his experiences with Sherry Pie and accusing him of catfishing when the two studied together in the musical theater program at SUNY Cortland. Shimkus' post alleged that Gugliemelli deceived him using a fake identity of "Allison Mossey" to make promises of a musical career on Broadway. Shimkus also claimed that Gugliemelli coerced him into sending sexually suggestive fetish videos as part of the audition process.

In these videos, Shimkus was asked to play the character of Jeff, a steroid-dependent individual obsessed with growing muscle and gaining physical strength. In the script provided by Gugliemelli, Shimkus explained, the character of Jeff was supposed to appear ostensibly pleased with his body odor that resulted from taking steroids.

In an article with BuzzFeed News published on March 5, 2020, four other men came forward with similar allegations of Gugliemelli posing as Mossey and leading them to believe that recording sexually daring audition videos would increase their chances of being noticed by casting directors.

Another former classmate at SUNY Cortland alleged that Gugliemelli similarly deceived him to film various provocative scenes wearing revealing clothing as part of his audition for a musical production of The Nightmare Before Christmas, which he was told was affiliated with the director Tim Burton. One victim claimed that Gugliemelli had explicitly asked them to masturbate on camera. As of March 6, 2020, a total of seven victims of Gugliemelli's alleged misconduct have come forward.

Gugliemelli posted an apology on his Facebook page, saying that he was sorry for "[causing] such trauma and pain" and that he had been "seeking help and receiving treatment since coming back to NYC". On March 6, 2020, VH1 released a statement regarding the incident, and made the decision to disqualify Gugliemelli from the contest. According to the statement, the season would air as planned but Gugliemelli would not appear in the live finale. After both episodes three and five, wherein Sherry Pie won the challenge and received $5,000 cash tips, World of Wonder donated $5,000 to The Trevor Project.

Sherry was one of the top four queens but, due to her disqualification, she finished in fourth place, resulting in season 12 being the first to feature a top three since season 8.

Filmography

Television
 RuPaul's Drag Race (season 12) as contestant (disqualified, placed 4th)
 RuPaul's Drag Race: Untucked (season 12) as contestant (disqualified, placed 4th)
 The Tamron Hall Show as guest

References

External links
 Sherry Pie at IMDb

Living people
American drag queens
Sherry Pie
Year of birth missing (living people)